Omar And The Howlers is a Texas based electric blues and blues rock band, The original Howlers was formed in Hattiesburg, Mississippi in 1973. Three years later they moved to Austin, Texas. The band has regularly toured European countries. Led by singer/guitarist Omar Dykes, they are best known for the 1987 album Hard Times in the Land of Plenty which sold over half a million copies and whose title song was a top 20 hit in America.

Early years
Omar Kent Dykes grew up in McComb, Mississippi, began playing the guitar at age 12 and started his first band at 13. In his 20s, he gathered a group of musicians who started calling themselves 'the Howlers'. They specialized in frat parties and were a party band, playing music that included both "R&B, R&R and even the occasional polka and western swing tune". Dykes has said he remembers these days fondly. It was around this time that he started calling himself Omar and developed his penchant for the blues.

In 1976, the Howlers relocated to Austin, Texas, at the time sporting a bustling music scene, home to such up-and-coming artists as Stevie Ray Vaughan and Eric Johnson. After a year of gigging in Austin, the rest of the band quit, feeling that they were not cut out to play music full-time. As they headed back to Mississippi, Dykes stayed and kept the name. He worked out a new lineup, and recorded the debut album Big Leg Beat for Amazing Records in 1980, just after fellow Austin band The Fabulous Thunderbirds. The record was a local hit and was followed by I Told You So.

Success
It was not until 1987, however, when Dykes signed a recording contract with Columbia, that the band would succeed. That year saw the release of Hard Times in the Land of Plenty, that went on to sell over 500,000 copies. The band now consisted of Dykes singing and playing guitar, Bruce Jones on bass, and Wes Starr on drums. Dykes and this rhythm section have been playing together off and on for over 30 years.

Since then, Omar And The Howlers has released around twenty-five albums on Amazing, Austin, Columbia, Antone's, Bullseye Blues, Watermelon, Black Top, Blind Pig, Provogue, Ruf Records, and their current record label, Big Guitar Music.

Band members
 Omar Dykes - vocals, guitar
 Bruce Jones - bass
 Gene Brandon - drums (died: January 8, 2014)
 Eric "Scorch" Scortia - Hammond B-3 organ, piano, synthesizers
 Stephen Bruton - guitar (died: May 9, 2009)
 Paul Junior - bass
 Steve Kilmer - drums
 Mark Hallman - percussion
 Gary Primich - harmonica (died: September 23, 2007)
 Nick Connolly - organ
 Wes Starr - drums
 Barry Bihm - bass
 Kevin Hall - Drums
 Mike Buck - drums
 Kaz Kazanoff - tenor saxophone
 Richard Price - tenor saxophone and percussion (died: April 07, 2020)
 Jason Crisp - bass
 Ronnie James - bass
 Barry "Frosty" Smith - drums (died: April 12, 2017) 
 Jon Hahn - drums
 Fred Tripp - drums

Discography

Albums
 Big Leg Beat (1980)
 I Told You So (1984)
 Hard Times in the Land of Plenty (1987)
 Wall of Pride (1988)
 Monkey Land (1990)
 Blues Bag - [Omar Dykes] (1991)
 Live at Paradiso (1992)
 Courts of Lulu (1993)
 Muddy Springs Road (1995)
 World Wide Open (1996)
 Southern Style (1997)
 Swingland (1998)
 Live at the Opera House: Austin, Texas - August 30, 1987 (2000)
 The Screamin' Cat (2000)
 Big Delta (2002)
 Boogie Man (2004)
 Bamboozled: Live in Germany (2006)
 On The Jimmy Reed Highway - [Omar Kent Dykes and Jimmie Vaughan] (2007)
 Chapel Hill - [Nalle, Omar &  Magic Slim] (2008)
 Big Town Playboy - [Omar Kent Dykes featuring Jimmie Vaughan and Friends] (2009)
 Essential Collection (2012) 2CD compilation
 I'm Gone (2012)
 Too Much is Not Enough - [Omar & The Howlers featuring Gary Primich] (2012)
 Just a Little Bit More... - [Gary Primich with Omar Dykes] (2012)
 Runnin' With the Wolf - [Omar Dykes] (2013)
 Too Raw for Radio [previously unreleased recordings from 1981] (2014)
 The Kitchen Sink (2015)
 Zoltar's Walk (2017)

Singles

References

External links
 Official website
 Russian Music Info Pages

American blues musical groups
Black Top Records artists
Texas blues musicians
Electric blues musicians
American blues rock musical groups
Ruf Records artists